All Eternals Deck is the thirteenth studio album by the Mountain Goats, released on March 29, 2011 by Merge Records. "All Eternals Deck" refers to a fictional set of Tarot cards, the history and details of which are described in the album's liner notes.

Track listing

John Darnielle revealed in a concert on October 13, 2012 at the Music Hall of Williamsburg that not only is "Rotten Stinking Mouthpiece" his 'secret favorite song', but that it is about Lon Chaney Jr. and was inspired by his movie Indestructible Man.

Personnel
 John Darnielle – vocals, guitar, keyboard
 Peter Hughes – bass, backing vocals
 Jon Wurster – drums
 Yoed Nir – cello
 Yuval Semo – organ, string arrangement
 Bob Barone – steel guitar
 Brandon Eggleston – production, mixing
 Erik Rutan – production
 John Congleton – production, mixing
 Scott Solter – production, mixing
 Brent Lambert – mastering
 Marc Bessant – graphic design
 Artbeats – photography

References

2011 albums
The Mountain Goats albums
Merge Records albums
Albums produced by Brandon Eggleston
Albums produced by Erik Rutan
Albums produced by John Congleton
Albums produced by Scott Solter